Alemany is a surname. Notable people with the surname include:

Arnau Alemany (born 1948), Spanish painter
Ellen Alemany (born 1955), American banker
Iván Alemany (born 1967), Spanish cyclist
Jacqueline Alemany (born 1989), American journalist
Joseph Sadoc Alemany (1814–1888), Spanish Roman Catholic archbishop
Juan Francisco Alemany (born 1963), Spanish handball player

Catalan-language surnames